Helen's tree frog (Rhacophorus helenae) is a flying frogs found in low-lying forests of southern Vietnam, from Nui Ong Nature Reserve, Bình Thuận Province to jungle in Tân Phú District, Đồng Nai. It is named after Helen M. Rowley, mother of one of the discoverers.

The back and head are green or blue with white spots. Its belly and eyes are white, and has webbed hands and feet which help this frog to glide from tree to tree, and occasionally from the canopy to the ground to breed. This frog is under threat due to the large human population.

See also
Flying frog

References

External links
New flying frog species found in Vietnam
 

helenae
Amphibians described in 2012
Frogs of Asia
Amphibians of Vietnam
Endemic fauna of Vietnam
Taxa named by Jodi Rowley